Yerburgh is a surname. Notable people with the surname include:

Elma Yerburgh (1864–1946), British business woman and philanthropist, wife of Robert Armstrong Yerburgh
Hugh Wardell-Yerburgh (1938–1970), British rower
Janet Wardell-Yerburgh (born 1940), British fencer
Oswald Wardell-Yerburgh (1858–1913), originally Oswald Yerburgh, an English clergyman 
Robert Armstrong Yerburgh (1853–1916), British barrister and politician, brother of Oswald Wardell-Yerburgh
Robert Yerburgh, 1st Baron Alvingham (1889–1955), British politician, son of Robert Armstrong Yerburgh

See also 

 Burgh

Surnames of English origin
Surnames of Scottish origin
Surnames of British Isles origin
English-language surnames
Scottish surnames